Paul Kagame (born 23 October 1957) is a Rwandan politician and former military officer who is the fourth and current president of Rwanda since 2000. He previously served as a commander of the Rwandan Patriotic Front (RPF), a rebel armed force which invaded Rwanda in 1990. The RPF was one of the parties of the conflict during the Rwandan Civil War and the armed force which ended the Rwandan genocide. He was considered Rwanda's de facto leader when he served as Vice President and Minister of Defence under President Pasteur Bizimungu from 1994 to 2000 after which the "Vice President" post was abolished.

Born to a Tutsi family in southern Rwanda, his family fled to Uganda when he was two years old, where he would spend the rest of his childhood during the Rwandan Revolution, which ended centuries of Tutsi political dominance. In the 1980s, Kagame fought in Yoweri Museveni's rebel army, becoming a senior Ugandan army officer after many military victories led Museveni to the Ugandan presidency. Kagame joined the RPF, taking control of the group when previous leader Fred Rwigyema died on the second day of the 1990 invasion. By 1993, the RPF controlled significant territory in Rwanda and a ceasefire was negotiated. The assassination of Rwandan President Juvénal Habyarimana set off the genocide, in which Hutu extremists killed an estimated 500,000 to 800,000 Tutsi and moderate Hutu. Kagame resumed the civil war and ended the genocide with a military victory.

During his vice presidency, Kagame controlled the national army and was responsible for maintaining the government's power, while other officials began rebuilding the country. Many RPF soldiers carried out retribution killings. Kagame said he did not support these killings but failed to stop them. Hutu refugee camps formed in Zaire and other countries and the RPF attacked the camps in 1996, but insurgents continued to attack Rwanda. As part of the invasion, Kagame sponsored two rebel wars in Zaire. Rwandan- and Ugandan-backed rebels won the first war (1996–97), installing Laurent-Désiré Kabila as president in place of dictator Mobutu and returning Zaire to its former pre-Mobutu name, the Democratic Republic of the Congo (DRC). The second war was launched in 1998 against Kabila, and later his son Joseph, following the DRC government's expulsion of Rwandan and Ugandan military forces from the country. The war escalated into a conflict that lasted until a 2003 peace deal and ceasefire.

Bizimungu resigned in 2000, most likely having been forced to do so, following a falling out with the RPF. He was replaced by Kagame. Bizimungu was later imprisoned for corruption and inciting ethnic violence, charges that human rights groups described as politically motivated. Kagame's rule is considered authoritarian, and human rights groups accuse him of political repression. Overall opinion on the regime by foreign observers is mixed, and as president, Kagame has prioritized national development, launching programmes which have led to development on key indicators including healthcare, education and economic growth. Kagame has had mostly good relations with the East African Community and the United States; his relations with France were poor until 2009. Relations with the DRC remain tense despite the 2003 ceasefire; human rights groups and a leaked United Nations report allege Rwandan support for two insurgencies in the country, a charge Kagame denies. Several countries suspended aid payments in 2012 following these allegations. Since coming to power, Kagame has won three presidential elections, but none of these have been rated free or fair by international observers. His role in the assassination of exiled political opponents has been controversial.

Early life
Kagame was born on 23 October 1957, the youngest of six children, in Tambwe, Ruanda-Urundi, a village located in what is now the Southern Province of Rwanda. His father, Deogratias Rutagambwa, was a member of the Tutsi ethnic group, from which the royal family had been derived since the 18th century or earlier. A member of the Bega clan, Deogratias Rutagambwa had family ties to King Mutara III, but he pursued an independent business career rather than maintain a close connection to the royal court. Kagame's mother, Asteria Bisinda, descended from the family of the last Rwandan queen, Rosalie Gicanda, that is from the Hebera branch of the royal Nyiginya clan. 

At the time of Kagame's birth, Rwanda was a United Nations Trust Territory which had been ruled, in various forms, by Belgium since 1916 under a mandate to oversee eventual independence. Rwandans were made up of three distinct groups: the minority Tutsi were the traditional ruling class, and the Belgian colonialists had long promoted Tutsi supremacy, whilst the majority Hutu were agriculturalists.

Tensions between Tutsi and Hutu had been escalating during the 1950s, and culminated in the 1959 Rwandan Revolution. Hutu activists began killing Tutsi, forcing more than 100,000 Tutsis to seek refuge in neighbouring countries. Kagame's family abandoned their home and lived for two years in the far northeast of Rwanda and eventually crossing the border into Uganda. They moved gradually north, and settled in the Nshungerezi refugee camp in the Toro sub-region in 1962. It was around this time that Kagame first met Fred Rwigyema, the future leader of the Rwandan Patriotic Front.

Kagame began his primary education in a school near the refugee camp, where he and other Rwandan refugees learned how to speak English and began to integrate into Ugandan culture. At the age of nine, he moved to the respected Rwengoro Primary School, around 16 kilometres (10 mi) away. He subsequently attended Ntare School, one of the best schools in Uganda, which was also the alma mater of future Ugandan President Yoweri Museveni. According to Kagame, the death of his father in the early-1970s, and the departure of Rwigyema to an unknown location, led to a decline in his academic performance and an increased tendency to fight those who belittled the Rwandan population. He was eventually suspended from Ntare and completed his studies at Old Kampala Secondary School.

After completing his education, Kagame made two visits to Rwanda, in 1977 and 1978. He was initially hosted by family members of his former classmates, but upon arrival in Kigali; he made contact with members of his own family. He kept a low profile on these visits, believing that his status as a well-connected Tutsi exile could lead to arrest. On his second visit, he entered the country through Zaire rather than Uganda to avoid suspicion. Kagame used his time in Rwanda to explore the country, familiarise himself with the political and social situation, and make connections that would prove useful to him in his later activities.

Military career, 1979–1994

Ugandan Bush War

In 1978, Fred Rwigyema returned to western Uganda and reunited with Kagame. During his absence, Rwigyema had joined the rebel army of Yoweri Museveni. Based in Tanzania, it aimed to overthrow the Ugandan government of Idi Amin. Rwigyema returned to Tanzania and fought in the 1979 war during which Museveni's rebel group, FRONASA, allied with the Tanzanian army and other Ugandan exiles, defeated Amin. After Amin's defeat Kagame and other Rwandan refugees pledged allegiance to Museveni, who had become a cabinet member in the transition government. Kagame received training at the United States Army Command and General Staff College, Fort Leavenworth, Kansas.

Former incumbent Milton Obote won the 1980 Ugandan general election. Museveni disputed the result, and he and his followers withdrew from the new government in protest. In 1981, Museveni formed the rebel Popular Resistance Army (PRA); Kagame and Rwigyema joined as founding soldiers, along with 38 Ugandans. The army's goal was to overthrow Obote's government, in what became known as the Ugandan Bush War. Kagame took part in the Battle of Kabamba, the PRA's first operation, in February 1981.

Kagame and Rwigema joined the PRA primarily to ease conditions for Rwandan refugees persecuted by Obote. They also had a long-term goal of returning with other Tutsi refugees to Rwanda; military experience would enable them to fight the Hutu-dominated Rwandan army. The PRA merged with another rebel group in June 1981, forming the National Resistance Army (NRA). In the NRA, Kagame specialized in intelligence-gathering, and he rose to a position close to Museveni's. The NRA, based in the Luwero Triangle, fought the Ugandan army for the next five years, even after Obote was deposed in a 1985 coup d'état and the start of peace talks.

In 1986, the NRA captured Kampala with a force of intelligence. In a 2018 paper, Canadian scholar and Rwanda expert Gerald Caplan described this appointment as a remarkable achievement for a foreigner and a refugee. Caplan noted Museveni's reputation for toughness, and said that Kagame would have had to be similarly tough to earn such a position. He also commented on the nature of military intelligence work, saying "it is surely unrealistic to expect that Kagame refrained from the kind of unsavory activities that military security specializes in." In addition to their army duties, Kagame and Rwigyema began building a covert network of Rwandan Tutsi refugees within the army's ranks, intended as the nucleus for an attack on Rwanda. In 1989 Rwanda's President Habyarimana and many Ugandans in the army began to criticise Museveni over his appointment of Rwandan refugees to senior positions, and he demoted Kagame and Rwigyema.

Kagame and Rwigeema remained de facto senior officers, but the change caused them to accelerate their plans to invade Rwanda. They joined an organisation called the Rwandan Patriotic Front (RPF), a refugee association which had been operating under various names since 1979. Rwigyema became the RPF leader shortly after joining and, while still working for the Ugandan army, he and Kagame completed their invasion plans.

Rwandan Civil War

Kagame was not present at the initial raids, as he was in the United States, attending the Command and General Staff College in Fort Leavenworth, Kansas. On the second day of the attack, Rwigyema was shot in the head and killed. The exact circumstances are disputed; the official line of Kagame's government, and the version mentioned by historian Gérard Prunier in his 1995 book on the subject, was that Rwigyema was killed by a stray bullet. 

In his 2009 book Africa's World War, Prunier says Rwigyema was killed by his subcommander Peter Bayingana, following an argument over tactics. According to this account, Bayingana and fellow subcommander Chris Bunyenyezi were then executed on the orders of Museveni. In a 2005 conversation with Caplan, Prunier provided a different account, stating that Bayingana and Bunyenyezi's killers were recruited by Kagame. Caplan notes that lack of research means the truth of this is uncertain, but that if true, the "tales of death and intrigue [offer] yet another insight into Kagame's character". Rwigyema's death threw the RPF into confusion. France and Zaire deployed forces in support of the Rwandan army, and by the end of October, the RPF had been pushed back into the far north east corner of the country.

Kagame returned to Africa and took command of the RPF forces, which had been reduced to fewer than 2,000 troops. Kagame and his soldiers moved west, through Uganda, to the Virunga Mountains, a rugged high-altitude area where the terrain worked in their favour. From there, he re-armed and reorganised the army, and carried out fundraising and recruitment from the Tutsi diaspora. Kagame restarted combat in January 1991, with an attack on the northern town of Ruhengeri. Benefiting from the element of surprise, the RPF captured the town and held it for a day before retreating back into the forests.

For the next year, the RPF waged a hit-and-run guerrilla war, capturing some border areas but not making significant gains against the Rwandan army. These actions caused an exodus of around 300,000 Hutu from the affected areas. Prunier wrote in 1995 that the RPF were surprised that Hutu peasants "showed no enthusiasm for being 'liberated' by them". In her 2018 book In Praise of Blood, however, Canadian journalist Judi Rever quoted witnesses who said that the exodus was forced by RPF attacks on the villages including the laying of landmines and shooting of children. Caplan's paper questions the credibility of many of the witnesses Rever had spoken to, but noted that "there are considerable other sources besides Rever that attest to RPF war crimes". 

Following the June 1992 formation of a multi-party coalition government in Kigali, Kagame announced a ceasefire and initiated negotiations with the Rwandan government in Arusha, Tanzania. In early-1993, groups of extremist Hutu formed and began campaigns of large-scale violence against the Tutsi. Kagame responded by suspending peace talks temporarily and launching a major attack, gaining a large swathe of land across the north of the country.

Peace negotiations resumed in Arusha, and the resulting set of agreements, known as the Arusha Accords, were signed in August 1993. The RPF were given positions in a broad-based transitional government (BBTG) and in the national army. The United Nations Assistance Mission for Rwanda (UNAMIR), a peacekeeping force, arrived and the RPF were given a base in the national parliament building in Kigali to use during the establishment of the BBTG.

Rwandan genocide

On 6 April 1994, Rwandan President Habyarimana's plane was shot down near Kigali Airport, killing both Habyarimana and the President of Burundi, Cyprien Ntaryamira, as well as their entourage and three French crew members. The attackers remain unknown. Prunier, in his 1995 book, concluded that it was most likely a coup d'état carried out by extreme Hutu members of Habyarimana's government who feared that the president was serious about honouring the Arusha agreement, and was a planned part of the genocide. This theory was disputed in 2006 by French judge Jean-Louis Bruguière, and in 2008 by Spanish judge Fernando Andreu. Both alleged that Kagame and the RPF were responsible. 

Rever also held Kagame responsible, giving as his motive a desire to plunge Rwanda into disorder and therefore provide a platform for the RPF to complete their invasion of the country. Evaluating the two arguments later in 2018, Caplan questioned the evidence used by Bruguière and Rever, stating that it has been repeatedly "discredited for its methodology and its dependence on sources who have split bitterly with Kagame". Caplan also noted that Hutu extremists had made multiple prior threats to kill Habyarimana in their journals and radio stations, and cited eyewitness accounts of roadblocks being erected in Kigali and killings initiated within one hour of the crash – evidence that the shooting of the plane was ordered as the initiation of the genocide.

Following Habyarimana's death, a military committee led by Colonel Théoneste Bagosora took immediate control of the country. Under the committee's direction, the Hutu militia Interahamwe and the Presidential Guard began to kill Hutu and Tutsi opposition politicians and other prominent Tutsi figures. The killers then targeted the entire Tutsi population, as well as moderate Hutu, beginning the Rwandan genocide. Over the course of approximately 100 days, an estimated 206,000 to 800,000 Tutsi and moderate Hutu were killed on the orders of the committee. On 7 April, Kagame warned the committee and UNAMIR that he would resume the civil war if the killing did not stop. 

The next day, the Rwandan government forces attacked the national parliament building from several directions, but the RPF troops stationed there successfully fought back. Kagame began an attack from the north on three fronts, seeking to link up quickly with the troops isolated in Kigali. An interim government was set up but Kagame refused to talk to it, believing that it was just a cover for Bagosora's rule. Over the next few days, the RPF advanced steadily south, capturing Gabiro and large areas of countryside to the north and east of Kigali. They avoided attacking Kigali or Byumba at this stage, but conducted manoeuvres designed to encircle the cities and cut off supply routes.

Throughout April there were numerous attempts by UNAMIR to establish a ceasefire, but Kagame insisted each time that the RPF would not stop fighting unless the killings stopped. In late April, the RPF secured the whole of the Tanzanian border area and began to move west from Kibungo, to the south of Kigali. They encountered little resistance, except around Kigali and Ruhengeri. By 16 May, they had cut the road between Kigali and Gitarama, the temporary home of the interim government, and by 13 June, they had taken Gitarama, following an unsuccessful attempt by the Rwandan government forces to reopen the road. The interim government was forced to relocate to Gisenyi in the far north west. As well as fighting the war, Kagame was recruiting heavily to expand the army. The new recruits included Tutsi survivors of the genocide and refugees from Burundi, but were less well trained and disciplined than the earlier recruits.

Having completed the encirclement of Kigali, Kagame spent the latter half of June fighting to take the city. The government forces had superior manpower and weapons, but the RPF steadily gained territory, as well as conducting raids to rescue civilians from behind enemy lines. According to Roméo Dallaire, the force commander of UNAMIR, this success was due to Kagame being a "master of psychological warfare"; he exploited the fact that the government forces were concentrating on the genocide rather than the fight for Kigali, and capitalised on the government's loss of morale as it lost territory. The RPF finally defeated the Rwandan government forces in Kigali on 4 July, and on 18 July took Gisenyi and the rest of the north west, forcing the interim government into Zaire and ending the genocide. At the end of July 1994, Kagame's forces held the whole of Rwanda except for a zone in the south west, which had been occupied by a French-led United Nations force as part of Opération Turquoise.

Kagame's tactics and actions during the genocide have proved controversial. Western observers such as Dallaire and Luc Marchal, the senior Belgian peacekeeper in Rwanda at the time, have stated that the RPF prioritised taking power over saving lives or stopping the genocide. Scholars also believe that the RPF killed many Rwandan civilians, predominantly Hutu, during the genocide and in the months that followed. The death toll from these killings is in the tens or even hundreds of thousands. In her book Leave None to Tell the Story: Genocide in Rwanda, written for Human Rights Watch, Rwanda expert Alison des Forges wrote that despite saving many lives, the RPF "relentlessly pursued those whom they thought guilty of genocide" and that "in their drive for military victory and a halt to the genocide, the RPF killed thousands, including noncombatants as well as government troops and members of militia". 

Human rights violations by the RPF during the genocide have also been documented in a 2000 report compiled by the Organisation of African Unity, and by Prunier in Africa's World War. In an interview with journalist Stephen Kinzer, Kagame acknowledged that killings had occurred but said that they were carried out by rogue soldiers and had been impossible to control. RPF killings continued after the end of the genocide, gaining international attention with the 1995 Kibeho massacre, in which soldiers opened fire on a camp for internally displaced persons in Butare Province. Australian soldiers serving as part of UNAMIR estimated at least 4,000 people were killed, while the Rwandan government claimed that the death toll was 338.

Marriage and children

On 10 June 1989 in Uganda, Kagame married Jeannette Nyiramongi, a Tutsi exile living in Nairobi, Kenya. Kagame had asked his relatives to suggest a suitable marriage and they recommended Nyiramongi. Kagame travelled to Nairobi and introduced himself, persuading her to visit him in Uganda. Nyiramongi was familiar with the RPF and its goal of returning refugees to Rwanda. She held Kagame in high regard. The couple have four children. Their first son, Ivan Cyomoro, was born in 1990 and their other children are Ange, Ian, and Brian.

Vice President and Minister of Defence
The post-genocide Rwandan government took office in Kigali in July 1994. It was based loosely on the Arusha Accords, but Habyarimana's party, MRND was outlawed. The positions it had been assigned were taken over by the RPF. The military wing of the RPF was renamed as the Rwandan Patriotic Army (RPA), and became the national army. Paul Kagame assumed the dual roles of Vice President of Rwanda and Minister of Defence while Pasteur Bizimungu, a Hutu who had been a civil servant under Habyarimana before fleeing to join the RPF, was appointed president. Bizimungu and his cabinet had some control over domestic affairs, but Kagame remained commander-in-chief of the army and was the de facto ruler of the country. German public broadcaster Deutsche Welle stated that "Bizimungu was commonly seen as a placeholder for Kagame".

Domestic situation

The infrastructure and economy of the country suffered greatly during the genocide. Many buildings were uninhabitable, and the former regime had taken all currency and moveable assets when they fled the country. Many who remained were traumatised; most had lost relatives, witnessed killings, or participated in the genocide. Kagame controlled the national army and was responsible for maintaining the government's power, while other officials began rebuilding the country.

Non-governmental organisations began to move back into the country, and the international community spent US$1.5 billion on humanitarian aid between July and December 1994, but Prunier described this as "largely unconnected with the real economic needs of the community". Kagame strove to portray the government as inclusive and not Tutsi-dominated. He directed removal of ethnicity from citizens' national identity cards, and the government began a policy of downplaying the distinctions between Hutu, Tutsi, and Twa.

The unity government suffered a partial collapse in 1995. The continuing violence, along with appointing of local government officials who were almost exclusively RPF Tutsi, caused serious disagreement between Kagame and senior Hutu government members, including prime minister Faustin Twagiramungu and interior minister Seth Sendashonga. Twagiramungu resigned in August, and Kagame fired Sendashonga and three others the next day. Pasteur Bizimungu remained president but the makeup of the new government was predominantly RPF Tutsi loyal to Kagame. 

Twagiramungu and Sendashonga moved abroad to form a new opposition party shortly after leaving the government. Sendashonga, who had also spoken out about the need for punishing killings by rogue RPF soldiers, moved to Kenya. Having survived an attempt on his life in 1996, he was assassinated in Nairobi in May 1998, when a UN vehicle in which he was travelling was fired upon. Many observers believe Kagame ordered the killing; as Caplan noted: "the RPF denied any responsibility, which no one other than RPF partisans believed".

Refugee crisis and insurgency

Following the RPF victory, approximately two million Hutu fled to refugee camps in neighboring countries, particularly Zaire, fearing RPF reprisals for the Rwandan genocide. The camps were set up by the United Nations High Commissioner for Refugees (UNHCR), but were effectively controlled by the army and government of the former Hutu regime, including many leaders of the genocide. This regime was determined to return to power in Rwanda and began rearming, killing Tutsi residing in Zaire, and launching cross-border incursions in conjunction with the Interahamwe paramilitary group. By late 1996, the Hutu militants represented a serious threat to the new Rwandan regime, and Kagame launched a counteroffensive.

Kagame first provided troops and military training to aid a rebellion against Zaire by the Banyamulenge, a Tutsi group living near Bukavu in the Zairian South Kivu province. With Rwandan army support, the Banyamulenge defeated local security forces and began attacking the Hutu refugee camps in the area. At the same time, Kagame's forces joined with Zairian Tutsi around Goma to attack two of the camps there. Most refugees from the attacked camps moved to the large Mugunga camp. In November 1996 the Rwandan army attacked Mugunga, causing an estimated 800,000 refugees to flee. Many returned to Rwanda despite the presence of the RPF; others ventured further west into Zaire.

Despite the disbanding of the camps, the defeated forces of the former regime continued a cross-border insurgency campaign into Rwanda from North Kivu. The insurgents maintained a presence in Rwanda's north western provinces and were supported by the predominantly Hutu population, many of whom had lived in the refugee camps before they were attacked. In addition to supporting the wars in the Congo, Kagame began a propaganda campaign to bring the Hutu to his side. He integrated former soldiers of the deposed genocidal regime's military into the RPF-dominated national army and appointed senior Hutu to key local government positions in the areas hit by insurgency. These tactics were eventually successful; by 1999, the population in the north west had stopped supporting the insurgency and the insurgents were mostly defeated.

Congo wars

Although his primary reason for military action in Zaire was the dismantling of the refugee camps, Kagame also began planning a war to remove long-time dictator President Mobutu Sese Seko from power. Mobutu had supported the genocidaires based in the camps, and was also accused of allowing attacks on Tutsi people within Zaire. Together with Ugandan President Yoweri Museveni, Kagame supported the newly created Alliance of Democratic Forces for the Liberation of Congo (ADFL), an alliance of four rebel groups headed by Laurent-Désiré Kabila, which began waging the First Congo War. 

The ADFL, helped by Rwandan and Ugandan troops, took control of North and South Kivu provinces in November 1996 and then advanced west, gaining territory from the poorly organised and demotivated Zairian army with little fighting. By May 1997, they controlled almost the whole of Zaire except for the capital Kinshasa; Mobutu fled and the ADFL took the capital without fighting. The country was renamed as the Democratic Republic of the Congo (DRC) and Kabila became the new president. The Rwandan Defence Forces and the ADFL were accused of carrying out mass atrocities during the First Congo War, with as many as 222,000 Rwandan Hutu refugees declared missing.

Kagame and the Rwandan government retained strong influence over Kabila following his inauguration, and the RPA maintained a heavy presence in Kinshasa. Congolese in the capital resented this, as did many in the eastern Kivu provinces, where ethnic clashes increased sharply. In July 1998, Kabila fired his Rwandan chief-of-staff, James Kabarebe, and ordered all RPA troops to leave the country. Kagame accused Kabila of supporting the ongoing insurgency against Rwanda from North Kivu, the same accusation he had made about Mobutu. He responded to the expulsion of his soldiers by backing a new rebel group, the Rally for Congolese Democracy (RCD), and launching the Second Congo War. 

The first action of the war was a blitzkrieg by the RCD and RPA, led by Kabarebe. These forces made quick gains, advancing in twelve days from the Kivu provinces west to within  of Kinshasa. The capital was saved by the intervention of Angola, Namibia and Zimbabwe on Kabila's side. Following the failure of the blitzkrieg, the conflict developed into a long-term conventional war, which lasted until 2003 and caused millions of deaths and massive damage. According to a report by the International Rescue Committee (IRC), this conflict led to the loss of between 3 million and 7.6 million lives, many through starvation and disease accompanying the social disruption of the war.

Although Kagame's primary reason for the two wars in the Congo was Rwanda's security, he was alleged to gain economic benefit by exploiting the mineral wealth of the eastern Congo. The 2001 United Nations Report of the Panel of Experts on the Illegal Exploitation of Natural Resources and Other Forms of Wealth of the Democratic Republic of the Congo alleged that Kagame, along with Ugandan President Museveni, were "on the verge of becoming the godfathers of the illegal exploitation of natural resources and the continuation of the conflict in the Democratic Republic of the Congo". The report also claimed that the Rwandan Ministry of Defence contained a "Congo Desk" dedicated to collecting taxes from companies licensed to mine minerals around Kisangani, and that substantial quantities of coltan and diamonds passed through Kigali before being resold on the international market by staff on the Congo Desk. 

International NGO Global Witness also conducted field studies in early 2013. It concluded that minerals from North and South Kivu are exported illegally to Rwanda and then marketed as Rwandan. Kagame dismissed these allegations as unsubstantiated and politically motivated; in a 2002 interview with newsletter Africa Confidential, Kagame said that if solid evidence against Rwandan officers was presented, it would be dealt with very seriously. In 2010, the United Nations released a report accusing the Rwandan army of committing wide scale human rights violations and crimes against humanity in the Democratic Republic of the Congo during the First and Second Congo Wars, charges denied by the Rwandan government.

Presidency

Accession
In the late 1990s, Kagame began to disagree publicly with Bizimungu and the Hutu-led government in Rwanda. Kagame accused Bizimungu of corruption and poor management, while Bizimungu felt that he had no power over appointments to the cabinet and that the Transitional National Assembly was acting purely as a puppet for Kagame. Bizimungu resigned from the presidency in March 2000. Historians generally believe that Bizimungu was forced into resigning by Kagame after denouncing the National Assembly and attempting to sow discord within the RPF. However, Kagame told Kinzer that he was surprised by the development saying that he had received the "startling news" in a phone call from a friend. Following Bizimungu's resignation, the Supreme Court ruled that Kagame should become acting president until a permanent successor was chosen.

Kagame had been de facto leader since 1994, but focused more on military, foreign affairs and the country's security than day-to-day governance. By 2000, the threat posed by cross-border rebels was reduced and when Bizimungu resigned, Kagame decided to seek the presidency himself. The transitional constitution was still in effect, which meant the president was elected by government ministers and the Transitional National Assembly rather than by a direct election.

The RPF selected two candidates, Kagame and RPF secretary general Charles Murigande; the ministers and parliament elected Kagame by eighty-one votes to three. Kagame was sworn in as president in April 2000. Several Hutu politicians, including the prime minister Pierre-Célestin Rwigema, left the government at around the same time as Bizimungu, leaving a cabinet dominated by those close to Kagame. Bizimungu started his own party in 2001, but Kagame's government banned it on the grounds that political campaigning was not permitted under the transitional constitution. The following year, Kagame issued a public statement to Bizimungu, warning him that the government's patience with his continued involvement in party politics was "not infinite", and Bizimungu was arrested two weeks later and convicted of corruption and inciting ethnic violence, charges which human rights groups said were politically motivated. He was imprisoned until 2007, when he was pardoned by Kagame.

New constitution

Between 1994 and 2003, Rwanda was governed by a set of documents combining President Habyarimana's 1991 constitution, the Arusha Accords, and some additional protocols introduced by the transitional government. As required by the accords, Kagame set up a constitutional commission to draft a new permanent constitution. The constitution was required to adhere to a set of fundamental principles including equitable power sharing and democracy. The commission sought to ensure that the draft constitution was "home-grown", relevant to Rwanda's specific needs, and reflected the views of the entire population; they sent questionnaires to civil groups across the country and rejected offers of help from the international community, except for financial assistance.

The draft constitution was released in 2003; it was approved by the parliament, and was then put to a referendum in May of that year. The constitution was overwhelmingly accepted, with  voting in favour. The constitution provided for a two-house parliament, an elected president serving seven-year terms, and multi-party politics. 

The constitution also sought to prevent Hutu or Tutsi hegemony over political power. Article 54 states that "political organizations are prohibited from basing themselves on race, ethnic group, tribe, clan, region, sex, religion or any other division which may give rise to discrimination". According to Human Rights Watch, this clause, along with later laws enacted by the parliament, effectively make Rwanda a one-party state, as "under the guise of preventing another genocide, the government displays a marked intolerance of the most basic forms of dissent".

Elections and referendum
Since ascending to the presidency in 2000, Kagame has faced three presidential elections, in 2003, 2010 and 2017. On each occasion, he was re-elected in a landslide, winning more than 90 percent of the vote. A constitutional amendment referendum in 2015, which gave Kagame the ability to stand for additional terms, also passed by similar margins. International election monitors, human rights organisations and journalists generally regard these elections as lacking freedom and fairness, with interventions by the Rwandan state to ensure Kagame's victory. According to Ida Sawyer, Central Africa director for Human Rights Watch, "Rwandans who have dared raise their voices or challenge the status quo have been arrested, forcibly disappeared, or killed, independent media have been muzzled, and intimidation has silenced groups working on civil rights or free speech". Following the 2017 poll, Human Rights Watch released evidence of irregularities by election officials including forcing voters to write their votes in full view and casting votes for electors who had not appeared. The United States department of state said it was "disturbed by irregularities observed during voting" as well as "long-standing concerns over the integrity of the vote-tabulation process".

In their 2018 book How to Rig an Election, political scientists Nic Cheeseman and Brian Klaas said they were asked by journalists why Kagame went "through the motions of organizing a national poll that he was predestined to win". The book gave likely reasons for the continuation of the polls, including the fact that elections are "important to secure a base level of international legitimacy" and that "not even pretending to hold elections will get a country kicked out of the African Union". Law professor and human rights researcher Lars Waldorf wrote that the RPF's manipulation of polls could be designed to make itself appear stronger. Waldorf said that the party's margins of victory "are not meant to be convincing; rather, they are meant to signal to potential opponents and the populace that Kagame and the RPF are in full control." Scholars are divided on whether Kagame would have won the elections had he not used manipulative tactics. Writing about RPF intimidation of opposition candidates in the run-up to elections, Caplan said "what was most infuriating was that none of this was necessary for the RPF to hold on to power". Belgian academic Filip Reyntjens disagrees, however, stating that "the RPF is fully aware that opening up the political system would eventually lead to a loss of power".

Presidential election, 2003

The first post-genocide election was held in August 2003, following the adoption of the new constitution. In May, the parliament voted to ban the Republican Democratic Movement (MDR), following a parliamentary commission report accusing the MDR of "divisive" ideology. The MDR had been one of the coalition parties in the transitional government of national unity, and was the second-largest party in the country after the RPF. Amnesty International criticised this move, claiming that "the unfounded allegations against the individuals mentioned in the report appear to be part of a government-orchestrated crackdown on the political opposition". Kagame was the RPF candidate, while former prime minister Twagiramungu was his main challenger. Twagiramungu had intended to run as the candidate for the MDR, but instead sought the presidency as an independent following the party's banishment. He returned to the country from Europe in June 2003 and began campaigning in August.

Kagame declared victory in the election one day after the poll, and his win was later confirmed by the National Electoral Commission. The campaign, election day, and aftermath were largely peaceful, although an observer from the European Union (EU) raised concerns about intimidation of opposition supporters by the RPF. Twagiramungu rejected the result of the election and also questioned the margin of victory, saying "Almost 100 per cent? That's not possible". He filed a petition at the Supreme Court to nullify the result, but was unsuccessful and he left Rwanda shortly afterwards, fearing that he would be arrested. The EU observer also questioned the result, citing "numerous irregularities", but also describing the poll as a "positive step" in the country's history.

Presidential election, 2010

Kagame ran for re-election in 2010, at the end of his first elected term. He was endorsed by the RPF national congress as their candidate in May 2010, and was accepted as a candidate in July. His highest-profile opponent was Victoire Ingabire, a Hutu who had been living abroad for some years, and returned to Rwanda in January 2010 to run for the presidency. After a series of criticisms of Kagame's policies, she was arrested in April and prohibited from running in the election, as part of what Amnesty International's Tawanda Hondora described as "pre-electoral repression". Kagame began his campaign with a rally at Kigali's Amahoro Stadium on 20 July, and held rallies across the country during the subsequent campaign period. The rallies attracted tens of thousands, shouting enthusiastically for Kagame, although reporters for The New York Times interviewed a number of Rwandans who said that they were "not free to vote against him and that government officials down to the village level had put enormous pressure on them to register to vote; contribute some of their meager earnings to Mr. Kagame’s campaign; and attend rallies".

The election went ahead in August 2010 without Ingabire and two other banned candidates, Kagame facing three opponents described by Human Rights Watch as "broadly supportive of the RPF". Kagame went on to receive  of the vote in the election. Opposition and human rights groups said that the election was tainted by repression, murder, and lack of credible competition. Kagame responded by saying "I see no problems, but there are some people who choose to see problems where there are not."

Constitutional referendum, 2015

As Kagame's second term progressed, he began to hint that he might seek to rewrite the term-limit clause of the Rwandan constitution, to allow him to run for a third term in the 2017 elections. Earlier in his presidency he had ruled it out, but in a 2014 speech at Tufts University in the United States, Kagame said that he did not know when he would leave office, and that it was up to the Rwandan people to decide. He told delegates "...let's wait and see what happens as we go. Whatever will happen, we'll have an explanation." The following year a protest occurred outside parliament, and a petition signed by 3.7 million people—more than half of the electorate—was presented to lawmakers asking for Kagame to be allowed to stay in office. The parliament responded by passing an amendment to the constitution in November 2015, with both the Chamber of Deputies and the Senate voting unanimously in favour. The motion passed kept the two-term limit in place, and also reduced the length of terms from 7 years to 5 years, but it made an explicit exception for Kagame, who would be permitted to run for a third 7-year term followed by two further 5-year terms, if he so desired. After the amendment was passed in parliament, a referendum was required for it to come into effect.

The referendum took place on 18 December 2015, with Rwandans overseas voting on 17 December. The electoral commission stated that the vote had been peaceful and orderly. The Democratic Green Party, the most prominent domestic group opposing the change, protested that it had not been permitted to campaign openly against the amendment. Human Rights Watch executive director Ken Roth announced on Twitter that he did not believe the election to be free and fair, saying there was "no suspense in Rwanda referendum when so many dissidents silenced, civil society stifled". The amendment itself was criticised by the European Union and also the United States, which released a statement saying that Kagame should respect the previous term limits and "foster a new generation of leaders in Rwanda". Kagame responded that it was not his own decision to seek a third term, but that the parliament and the people had demanded it.

Presidential election, 2017

In accordance with the constitutional change, a presidential election was held in August 2017. The highest-profile opposition figure for the 2017 election was local businesswoman Diane Rwigara. Although she acknowledged that "much has improved under Kagame", Rwigara was also critical of Kagame's government, saying that "people disappear, others get killed in unexplained circumstances and nobody speaks about this because of fear". Like Ingabire in 2010, Rwigara was barred from running in the election. Kagame was endorsed as the RPF's candidate for the election in mid-June, and began his re-election campaign in mid-July with a rally in Ruhango.

After three weeks of campaigning, concluding with a large rally in Gasabo District, the election went ahead between Kagame and two opposition candidates. He was sworn in for another seven-year term on 18 August. As with his previous victories, independent monitors and human rights organisations cited irregularities and intimidation in the conduct of the election. Cheeseman and Klaas said in their book that he had "not even bothered to try and manipulate the election in the clever ways" he had used in previous campaigns.

Domestic policy

Vision 2020 and Vision 2050

In the late 1990s, Kagame began actively planning methods to achieve national development. He launched a national consultation process and also sought the advice of experts from emerging nations including China, Singapore and Thailand. Following these consultations, and shortly after assuming the presidency, Kagame launched an ambitious programme of national development called Vision 2020. The major purposes of the programme were to unite the Rwandan people and to transform Rwanda from a highly impoverished into a middle income country. The programme consists of a list of goals which the government aims to achieve before the year 2020. These include reconstruction, infrastructure and transport improvements, good governance, improving agriculture production, private sector development, and health and education improvements.

In 2011, the Ministry of Finance and Economic Planning (MINECOFIN) issued a report indicating the progress of the Vision 2020 goals. The report examined the stated goals of the programme and rated each one with a status of "on-track", "on-watch" or "off-track". The major areas identified as off-track were population, poverty and the environment. By 2012, MINECOFIN's review found that 26% of Vision 2020's original indicators had already been achieved. While also highlighting key areas for improvement, the review made several upward revisions, including revising the GDP per capita target from $900 to $1,240. In the same year, an independent review of the strategy carried out by academics based in Belgium rated progress as "quite encouraging", mentioning development in the education and health sectors, as well as Kagame's fostering of a favourable business environment. The review also raised concerns about the policy of "maximum growth at any cost", suggesting that this was leading to a situation in which the rich prospered while the rural poor saw little benefit.

Upon completion of the programme in December 2020, Kagame announced Vision 2050, remarking that "Vision 2020 was about what we had to do in order to survive and regain our dignity. But Vision 2050 has to be about the future we choose, because we can, and because we deserve it." Vision 2050 focuses around the two main pillars of Economic Growth and Prosperity and High Quality of Life and Standards of Life for Rwandans. Vision 2050 is the programmatic articulation of Kagame's ambition for Rwanda to become an upper-middle income country by 2035, and a high-income country by 2050.

Economy

 
Rwanda's economy has grown rapidly under Kagame's presidency, with per-capita gross domestic product (purchasing power parity) estimated at $2,214 in 2020, compared with $631 in 2000. Kagame's economic policy is based on liberalising the economy, reducing red tape for businesses, and transforming the country from an agricultural to a knowledge-based economy. Kagame has stated that he believes Rwanda can emulate the economic development of Singapore since 1960. Kagame, as set out in the national Vision 2050 Policy, believes that Rwanda can become an upper-middle income country by 2035, and a high-income country by 2050.

Kagame's economic policy has been praised by many foreign donors and investors, including Bill Clinton and Starbucks chairman Howard Schultz. The country is also recognized internationally for its effective institutions and low levels of corruption.

Rwanda has also illegally exploited Congolese minerals, which is an important aspect of the success of Rwanda's economy. Political economy researcher Stefaan Marysse estimated that in 1999, 6.1% of Rwanda's GDP came from illegal resource extraction in the DRC. In 2013, foreign aid made up over 20 percent of GDP and nearly half of the budget. Economic growth has disproportionally accrued to elites in the capital while rural areas lag behind. Although the government officially has a policy of privatization, in practice it has increased state control of the economy using corporations with strong ties to the state and the ruling party.

Rwanda is a country of few natural resources, and the economy is heavily dependent on subsistence agriculture, with an estimated  of the working population engaged in farming. Under Kagame's presidency, the service sector has grown strongly. In 2010, it became the country's largest sector by economic output, contributing  of the country's GDP. Key tertiary contributors include banking and finance, wholesale and retail trade, hotels and restaurants, transport, storage, communication, insurance, real estate, business services, and public administration, including education and health. Information and communications technology (ICT) is a Vision 2020 priority, with a goal of transforming Rwanda into an ICT hub for Africa. To this end, the government has completed a  fibre-optic telecommunications network, intended to provide broadband services and facilitate electronic commerce. Tourism is one of the fastest-growing economic resources and became the country's leading foreign exchange earner in 2011.

Rwanda ranks highly in several categories of the World Bank's ease of doing business index. In 2005, after the country was ranked 158th on the Ease of Doing Business Index, Kagame set up a special unit to analyze the economy and provide solutions to easing business. As a result, the country topped the list of reformers in 2009. In 2012, the country's overall ease of doing business index ranking was 52nd out of 185 countries worldwide, and third out of 46 in Sub-Saharan Africa. It was eighth on the 2012 rankings for ease of starting a business; the Rwanda Development Board asserts that a business can be authorised and registered in 24 hours. The business environment and economy also benefit from relatively low corruption in the country; in 2010, Transparency International ranked Rwanda as the eighth cleanest out of 47 countries in Sub-Saharan Africa and sixty-sixth cleanest out of 178 in the world.

Education and health

Kagame has made education for youth in Rwanda a high priority for his administration, allocating  of the annual budget to the sector. The Rwandan government provides free education in state-run schools for twelve years: six years in primary and six in secondary school. The final three years of free education were introduced in 2012 following a pledge by Kagame during his 2010 re-election campaign. From 1994 until 2009, secondary education was offered in either French or English; since 2009, due to the country's increasing ties with the East African Community and the Commonwealth of Nations, English has been the sole language of instruction in public schools from primary school grade 4 onward.

Rwanda's health profile is dominated by communicable diseases, including malaria, pneumonia, and HIV/AIDS. Prevalence and mortality rates have sharply declined in the past decade but the short supply or unavailability of certain medicines continues to challenge disease management. Kagame's government is seeking to improve this situation as one of the Vision 2020 priorities. These policies have contributed to a steady increase in quality of healthcare and improvement in key indicators during Kagame's presidency. In 2010, 91 children died before their fifth birthday for every 1000 live births, down from 163 under five deaths for every 1000 live births in 1990. Prevalence of some diseases is declining, including the elimination of maternal and neonatal tetanus and a sharp reduction in malaria morbidity, mortality rate, and specific lethality. In response to shortages in qualified medical personnel, in 2011 the Rwandan government launched an eight-year US$151.8 million initiative to train medical professionals.

Kagame has garnered praise for the country's response to the ongoing global COVID-19 pandemic. Despite the country having a relatively underdeveloped health care system, Rwanda has one of the lowest infection and mortality rates in the world, and is seen as a success story. Rwanda is currently the only nation in Africa whose residents are permitted to enter the Schengen Area for non essential travel. Rwanda's response has not been without its criticisms, in particular the curbing of civil liberties and individual freedoms. By April 2022. Rwanda was one of the few countries in Africa to have fully vaccinated over 60% of its population against COVID-19.

Foreign policy

Democratic Republic of the Congo

The Second Congo War, which began in 1998, was still raging when Kagame assumed the presidency in 2000. Namibia, Angola, Zimbabwe, and Chad had committed troops to the Congolese government side, while Rwanda, Uganda, and Burundi were supporting rebel groups. The rebel group Rally for Congolese Democracy (RCD) had split in 1999 into two factions: the RCD-Goma, supported by Rwanda, and the RCD-Kisangani, which was allied to Uganda. Uganda also supported the Movement for the Liberation of the Congo (MLC), a rebel group from the north. All these rebel groups were at war with Kabila's government in Kinshasa, but were also increasingly hostile to each other. Various peace meetings had been held, culminating in the July 1999 Lusaka Ceasefire Agreement which was signed by Kabila, Kagame and all the other foreign governments. The rebel groups were not party to the agreement, and fighting continued. The RPA continued to be heavily involved in the Congo War during 2000, fighting battles against the Ugandan army in Kisangani and against Kabila's army in Kasai and Katanga.

In January 2001, Kabila was assassinated inside his palace. His son Joseph was appointed president and immediately began asserting his authority by dismissing his father's cabinet and senior army commanders, assembling a new government, and engaging with the international community. The new government provided impetus for renewed peace negotiations, and in July 2002 a peace agreement was reached between Rwanda, Congo, and the other major participants, in which all foreign troops would withdraw and RCD-Goma would enter a power-sharing transitional government with Joseph Kabila as interim president until elections could be held. Kagame's government announced at the end of 2002 that all uniformed Rwandan troops had left Congolese territory, but this was contradicted by a 2003 report by UN panel of experts. According to this report, the Rwandan army contained a dedicated "Congo desk" which used the armed forces for large-scale illegal appropriation of Congolese resources.

Despite the agreement and subsequent ceasefire, relations between Kagame and the Congolese government remained tense. Kagame blamed the DRC for failing to suppress the Democratic Forces for the Liberation of Rwanda (FDLR), Rwandan Hutu rebels operating in North and South Kivu provinces. Kabila accused Rwanda of using the Hutu as a "pretext for maintaining its control and influence in the area". There has been ongoing conflict in Congo's eastern provinces since 2004, during which Kagame has backed two major insurgencies. This included a major rebellion from 2005 to 2009, led by Congolese Tutsi Laurent Nkunda, as well as the a rebellion carried out by the March 23 Movement (M23) under leader Bosco Ntaganda, beginning in 2012. A leaked United Nations report in 2012 cited Kagame's defence minister James Kabarebe as being effectively the commander of the M23. Relations have improved since 2016, as Kagame held a bilateral meeting with Kabila in Gisenyi. When Félix Tshisekedi was elected DRC president in 2019, Kagame – the AU chairman at the time – unsuccessfully called for an AU investigation into the poll. Despite this, he has developed a close relationship with Tshisekedi since the latter's election, with summits in both Kinshasa and Kigali. As of 2020, Kagame still faces accusations that Rwanda's troops are active within the Kivu provinces. Congolese officials such as Walikale member of parliament Juvénal Munubo, as well as civilians, have reported sighting RDF soldiers in the DRC, but Kagame consistently denies these claims.

Uganda and the East African Community

Kagame spent most of his childhood and young adult years living in Uganda, and has a personal relationship with President Yoweri Museveni dating back to the late 1970s; they fought together in the Ugandan Bush War, and Kagame was appointed head of military intelligence in Museveni's national army following the NRA victory in 1986. When the RPF soldiers abandoned the Ugandan army and invaded Rwanda in 1990, Museveni did not explicitly support them, but according to Prunier it is likely that he had prior knowledge of the plan. Museveni also allowed the RPF safe passage through Ugandan territory to the Virunga mountains after their early defeats in the war, and revealed in a 1998 heads of state meeting that Uganda had helped the RPF materially during the Rwandan Civil War. Following the RPF victory, the two countries enjoyed a close political and trade relationship.

Rwanda and Uganda were allies during the First Congo War against Zaire, with both countries being instrumental in the setting up of the AFDL and committing troops to the war. The two nations joined forces again at the beginning of the Second Congo War, but relations soured in late 1998 as Museveni and Kagame had very different priorities in fighting the war. In early 1999, the RCD rebel group split into two, with Rwanda and Uganda supporting opposing factions, and in August the Rwandan and Ugandan armies battled each other with heavy artillery in the Congolese city of Kisangani. The two sides fought again in Kisangani in May and June 2000, causing the deaths of 120 soldiers and around 640 Congolese civilians. Relations slowly thawed in the 2000s, and by 2011 the two countries enjoyed a close friendship once more. Further conflict between Kagame and Museveni arose in early 2019, as the two countries conflicted over trade and regional politics. Kagame accused Museveni's government of supporting the FDLR and harassing Rwandan nationals in Uganda, leading Rwanda to set up a blockade of trucks at the border. Museveni accused Rwanda of sending troops into its territory, including an incident in Rukiga district in which a Ugandan citizen was killed. The Rwanda–Uganda border reopened on 31 January 2022.

In 2007, Rwanda joined the East African Community, an intergovernmental organisation for the East Africa region comprising Uganda, Kenya, Tanzania, Burundi, and Rwanda. The country's accession required the signing of various agreements with the other members, including a defence intelligence sharing pact, a customs union, and measures to combat drug trafficking. The countries of the Community established a common market in 2011, and plan further integration, including moves toward political federation. The community has also set up an East African Monetary Institute, which aims to introduce a single currency by 2024.

France
France maintained close ties with President Habyarimana during his years in power, as part of its Françafrique policy. When the RPF launched the Rwandan Civil War in 1990, Habyarimana was immediately granted assistance from the President of France, François Mitterrand. France sent 600 paratroopers, who effectively ran the government's response to the invasion and were instrumental in regaining almost all territory the RPF had gained in the first days of the war. France maintained this military presence throughout the war, engaging Kagame's RPF forces again in February 1993 during the offensive that doubled RPF territory. In the later stages of the 1994 Rwandan genocide, France launched Opération Turquoise, a United Nations mandated mission to create safe humanitarian areas for protection of displaced persons, refugees, and civilians in danger; many Rwandans interpreted it as a mission to protect Hutu from the RPF, including some who had participated in the genocide. The French remained hostile to the RPF, and their presence temporarily stalled Kagame's advance in southwestern Rwanda.

France continued to shun the new RPF government following the end of the genocide and the withdrawal of Opération Turquoise. Diplomatic relations were finally reestablished in January 1995, but remained tense as Rwanda accused France of aiding the genocidaires, while France defended its interventions. In 2006, French judge Jean-Louis Bruguière released a report on the assassination of President Habyarimana which concluded that Kagame had ordered the shooting of the plane. Bruguière subsequently issued arrest warrants for nine of Kagame's close aides. Kagame denied the charges and immediately broke off diplomatic relations with France. Relations began to thaw in 2008, and diplomacy was resumed in late 2009. In 2010, Nicolas Sarkozy became the first French president to visit Rwanda since the genocide, admitting for the first time that France made "grave errors of judgment". Kagame reciprocated with an official visit to Paris in 2011.

United States, United Kingdom and the Commonwealth

Since the end of the Rwandan genocide in 1994, Rwanda has enjoyed a close relationship with the English speaking world, in particular the United States (US) and United Kingdom (UK). The two countries have been highly supportive of the RPF programme of stabilisation and rebuilding, with the UK donating large sums each year in budget support, and the US providing military aid as well as supporting development projects. As president, Kagame has been critical of the West's lack of response to the genocide, and the UK and US have responded by admitting guilt over the issue: Bill Clinton, who was President of the United States during the genocide, has described his failure to act against the killings as a "personal failure". During the 2000s, Clinton and UK prime minister Tony Blair praised the country's progress under Kagame, citing it as a model recipient for international development funds, and Clinton referred to Kagame as "one of the greatest leaders of our time". Both Clinton and Blair have maintained support for the country beyond the end of their terms of office, Clinton via the Clinton Global Initiative and Blair through his role as an unpaid advisor to the Rwandan government.

As part of his policy of maintaining close relations with English speaking countries, Kagame sought membership of the Commonwealth of Nations, which was granted in 2009. Rwanda was only the second country, after Mozambique, to join the Commonwealth having never had colonial links to the British Empire. Kagame attended the subsequent Commonwealth Heads of Government Meeting in Perth, Australia, addressing the Business Forum. Rwanda also successfully applied for a rotating seat on the United Nations Security Council in 2012, taking over the presidency of that organisation in April 2013.

Kagame's relations with the US and UK came under strain in the early 2010s, following allegations that Rwanda is supporting the M23 rebel movement in Eastern Congo. The UK suspended its budgetary aid programme in 2012, freezing a £21 million donation. Other European nations such as Germany also suspended general budgetary support from 2008 onwards. Payments by these countries were gradually restored from 2013, but took the form of sector budgetary support and support for specific programmes. The US also froze some of its military aid programme for Rwanda in 2012, although it stopped short of suspending aid altogether. By 2020, the US remained supportive of Kagame's government and was Rwanda's largest bilateral donor.

China and moves towards self-sufficiency
China has been investing in Rwandan infrastructure since 1971, with early projects including hospitals in Kibungo and Masaka. Under Kagame's presidency, trade between the two countries has grown rapidly. The volume of trade increased five-fold between 2005 and 2009, and it doubled again in the following three years, being worth US$160 million in 2012. Projects completed include the renovation of the Kigali road network, funded using a Chinese government loan and undertaken by China Road and Bridge Corporation; the Kigali City Tower, which was built by China Civil Engineering Construction; and a pay television service operated by Star Media.

Kagame has been vocal in his praise of China and its model for relations with Africa, saying in a 2009 interview that "the Chinese bring what Africa needs: investment and money for governments and companies". This is in contrast to Western countries, whom Kagame accuses of focussing too heavily on giving aid to the continent rather than building a trading relationship; he also believes that they keep African products out of the world marketplace by the use of high tariffs. China does not openly involve itself in the domestic affairs of the countries with which it trades, hence has not followed the West in criticising Kagame's alleged involvement in the war in the Congo.

Kagame's ultimate goal in international relations is to shift Rwanda from a country dependent on donor aid and loans towards self-sufficiency, trading with other countries on an equal footing. In a 2009 article, Kagame wrote that "the primary purpose of aid should ultimately be to work itself out", and should therefore focus on self-sufficiency and building private sector development. Kagame cited an example of donor countries providing free fertilisers to farmers; he believes this to be wrong because it undercuts local fertiliser businesses, preventing them from growing and becoming competitive. In 2012, Kagame launched the Agaciro Development Fund, following proposals made at a national dialogue session in 2011. Agaciro is a solidarity fund whose goal is to provide development finance sourced within Rwanda, supplementing aid already received from overseas. The fund invites contributions from Rwandan citizens, within the country and in the diaspora, as well as private companies and "friends of Rwanda". The fund will allocate its funds based on consultations with the populace, as well as financing projects contributing to the Vision 2020 programme.

Assassinations 
Throughout Kagame's tenure as vice president and president, he has been linked with murders and disappearances of political opponents, both in Rwanda and abroad. In a 2014 report titled "Repression Across Borders", Human Rights Watch documents at least 10 cases involving attacks or threats against critics outside Rwanda since the late 1990s, citing their criticism of the Rwandan government, the RPF or Kagame. Examples include the killing of Sendashonga in 1998, the assassination attempts against Nyamwasa in South Africa, as well as the murder of former intelligence chief Patrick Karegeya in South Africa on 31 December 2013. Speaking about Karegeya's killing, Kagame spoke of his approval, saying "whoever betrays the country will pay the price, I assure you". In 2015, a former Rwandan military officer testified before the U.S. Congress that the Rwandan government had offered him $1 million to assassinate Karegeya as well as Kagame critic General Kayumba Nyamwasa. After his testimony, this officer himself faced threats in Belgium as did a Canadian journalist. In December 2017, a South African court found that the Rwandan government continued to plot the assassination of its critics overseas.

Chairperson of the African Union
Kagame served as Chairperson of the African Union from 28 January 2018 to 10 February 2019. As Chair, Kagame promoted the Single African Air Transport Market (SAATM) and the African Continental Free Trade Area. The proposed Continental Free Trade Area was signed on 21 March 2018 by 44 of the 55 AU nations. By the time he left office in February 2019, the Continental Free Trade had already been ratified by 19 of the 22 nations needed for it to officially go into effect. Kagame also pushed through a reform of African Union structures in an effort to improve their effectiveness and make them financially sustainable.

Public image and personality

Views on his leadership vary widely amongst international scholars and journalists. According to political scientist Alexander Dukalskis, Kagame has been adept in developing a sophisticated positive image of Rwanda abroad. Duklaskis says that to suppress negative information, the Kagame regime has curtailed access to academics and journalists, and threatened and assassinated critics of the regime. Others, such as Philip Gourevitch, author of the 1998 book We Wish to Inform You That Tomorrow We Will Be Killed with Our Families, focus on his achievements in ending the genocide after the international community failed to do so, as well as the reconciliation, economic growth, foreign investment, improved public health and education. This is countered by authors such as Judi Rever, who highlight war crimes committed by the RPF before, during, and after the 1994 genocide, the effects of the civil war, assassinations of opponents and the totalitarianism of his regime. In Rethinking the Rwandan Narrative for the 25th Anniversary, Gerald Caplan states that a new narrative is required to reconcile these conflicting viewpoints, incorporating aspects from both points of view and "striking the proper balance between the old and the newly revised".

In Rwanda, Kagame's RPF is seen as a Tutsi-dominated party, and in the years following the 1994 genocide, it was deeply unpopular with the Hutu, who constitute  of the population. Approximately two million Hutu lived as refugees in neighbouring countries until 1996, when Kagame forced them to return home. Many Hutu also supported the late 1990s cross-border insurgency against Kagame by defeated forces of the former regime. By 1999, the RPF had weakened the insurgents and Tutsi and Hutu began living together peacefully in the northwest. Kayumba Nyamwasa, at the time still part of the Rwandan army, said that "the mood had changed", attributing a shift in Hutu attitude to a shift in the "balance of forces in the country", with the genocidaires having "no chance of returning to power". As of 2021, with a lack of free speech in Rwanda, and elections which are generally regarded as lacking freedom and fairness, Kagame's popularity amongst the Rwandwan population is unknown. Journalists Jason Burke of The Guardian and Al Jazeera'''s Rashid Abdallah describe the president as "authentically popular in Rwanda" and as enjoying "overwhelming public support" respectively. British journalist and author Michela Wrong and Filip Reyntjens disagree, with Wrong saying that "the level of invective Kagame dedicates to the Rwanda National Congress, the amount of energy he has expended trying to get Uganda and South Africa to expel or extradite or close down these players, suggests he sees them as a real threat".

Kagame's image amongst foreign leaders was very positive until the late 2000s. He was credited with ending the genocide, bringing peace and security to Rwanda, and achieving development. Since 2010, the international community has increasingly criticized Kagame following a leaked United Nations report alleging Rwanda's support for the rebel M23 movement in Congo. In 2012, the United Kingdom, Germany, the Netherlands and several other countries suspended programmes of budget support to Rwanda, with many redirecting their aid to project-based assistance.
 
Describing Kagame's personality, Roméo Dallaire has written that he has a "studious air that didn't quite disguise his hawk-like intensity". American journalist Stephen Kinzer, who wrote the biography A Thousand Hills: Rwanda's Rebirth and the Man Who Dreamed It in collaboration with Kagame himself, describes him as "one of the most intriguing leaders in Africa". Despite praising Kagame's leadership skills, Kinzer also cites a personality of "chronic impatience, barely suppressed anger, and impulsive scorn for critics". In an interview with the Daily Telegraph'''s Richard Grant, Kagame said that he sleeps for only four hours per night, devoting the remainder of his day to work, exercise, family, and reading academic texts and foreign newspapers. When asked about his reputation for physically beating his subordinates by journalist Jeffrey Gettleman, Kagame said, "I can be very tough, I can make mistakes like that".

Kagame has received many honours and accolades during his presidency. These include honorary degrees and medals from several Western universities, as well as the highest awards bestowed by the countries of Liberia and Benin. The Council for East and Central Africa Football Associations football tournament has been named the Kagame Interclub Cup since 2002, due to Kagame's sponsorship of the event.

Awards
Paul Kagame is the recipient of the Lifetime Achievement Award (Champions of the Earth) in 2016.

See also

 History of Rwanda
 Politics of Rwanda

Notes

References

Sources

External links

 
 
 
 
 
 
 Paul Kagame Biography and Interview on Academy of Achievement

|-

|-

|-

|-

1957 births
Defence ministers of Rwanda
Living people
Non-U.S. alumni of the Command and General Staff College
People from Ruhango District
People of the Rwandan genocide
Presidents of Rwanda
Rwandan Patriotic Front politicians
Rwandan politicians
Rwandan rebels
Rwandan refugees
Rwandan Roman Catholics
Rwandan soldiers
People educated at Ntare School
Rwandan expatriates in Uganda
Ugandan rebels
Tutsi people
Presidents of African Nations
21st-century Rwandan politicians